White Mountains is a national park in Queensland, Australia, 1156 km northwest of Brisbane, and 140 km south-west of Charters Towers and 80 km north-east of Hughenden.

On National Parks Day 2010 (Sunday, 28 March 2010), the Queensland State Government announced the addition of 4,200 hectares to the park.

See also

 Protected areas of Queensland

References

National parks of Queensland
Protected areas established in 1990
North West Queensland